St John Thornhill (1929 – 9 May 2003) was an Irish hurler who played at club level with Oldcastletown and at inter-county level with the Cork senior hurling team. He usually lined out as a corner-back.

Career

Thornhill first game to hurling prominence with the Oldcastletown club while also making an impression as a schoolboy at St Colman's College. He arrived on the inter-county scene as a member of the Cork minor hurling team in 1946, however, his two-year tenure in this grade ended without success. He also earned selection for the Cork junior hurling team and was part of their All-Ireland JHC title triumph in 1947. Even though he had just turned 18, Thornhill was a member of the extended panel of the Cork senior hurling team that year. He was a reserve when Cork lost the 1947 All-Ireland final to Kilkenny. Thornhill's religious studies impacted on his playing career and he made his last appearance in the Cork colours in a junior game in 1952.

Personal life and death

After his ordination, Thornhill spent over 30 years serving the Cobh parish before moving to Youghal in 1988. He had been named a monsignor shortly before his death on 9 May 2003.

Honours

Cork
Munster Senior Hurling Championship: 1947
All-Ireland Junior Hurling Championship: 1947
Munster Junior Hurling Championship: 1947

References

1929 births
2003 deaths
Kildorrery hurlers
Cork inter-county hurlers
Gaelic games players from County Cork